Vinnikovo is a rural locality (a selo) in Kalininsky Selsoviet of Mikhaylovsky District, Amur Oblast, Russia. The population was 177 as of 2018. There are 8 streets.

Geography 
Vinnikovo is located on the right left bank of the Raychikha River, 91 km east of Poyarkovo (the district's administrative centre) by road. Uspenovka is the nearest rural locality.

References 

Rural localities in Mikhaylovsky District, Amur Oblast